Saïf Ghezal (born 30 June 1981 in M'saken) is a retired Tunisian footballer and current manager of Stade Gabèsien.

Career
Ghezal previously played for Étoile Sportive du Sahel, and participated at the 2007 FIFA Club World Cup. He joined than in summer 2008 from Étoile Sportive du Sahel to Swiss club BSC Young Boys and then left Ghezal his club to sign for Al-Ahli Jeddah on 29 December 2009.

International career
Ghezal has played for the senior Tunisia national football team during qualifying matches for the 2010 FIFA World Cup.

Coaching career
On 5 February 2020, Ghezal was appointed manager of ES Beni-Khalled.

References

External links
 
  
 football.ch profile  
 

1981 births
Living people
Tunisian footballers
Tunisian football managers
Tunisia international footballers
2008 Africa Cup of Nations players
Étoile Sportive du Sahel players
Al-Ahli Saudi FC players
BSC Young Boys players
FC Thun players
Association football defenders
Swiss Super League players
Tunisian expatriate footballers
Expatriate footballers in Switzerland
Expatriate footballers in Saudi Arabia
Tunisian expatriate sportspeople in Saudi Arabia
Saudi Professional League players
Mediterranean Games gold medalists for Tunisia
Mediterranean Games medalists in football
Competitors at the 2001 Mediterranean Games
ES Hammam-Sousse managers
ES Beni-Khalled managers
Stade Gabèsien managers
21st-century Tunisian people